Saint Vincent and the Grenadines has competed at every edition of the Pan American Games since the eleventh edition of the multi-sport event in 1991. To date, all of Saint Vincent and the Grenadines's medals have been won in the sport of track and field. In 1995, Eswort Coombs won Saint Vincent and the Grenadines first medal, a bronze in the 400 metres track and field event. Kineke Alexander won the country's second medal, a bronze medal in the women's 400 metres in 2015. Saint Vincent and the Grenadines did not compete at the first and only Pan American Winter Games in 1990.

Medal count

Medals by sport

References